

Television

Radio

References

 
Baltimore Orioles
Broadcasters
Westinghouse Broadcasting
CBS Sports
CBS Radio Sports
Mid-Atlantic Sports Network